Mohammad Mokhtari (born 26 January 1984) is an Iranian football defender who currently plays for League 2 (Iran) club Damash Guilan.

Career
Mokhtari started his career with Shamoushak in 2002 when he promoted to first team squad by the coach Akbar Misaghian. in 2007 he joined Pegah. After Dissolution Pegah in 2008, he joined newly founded club, Damash. He extended his contract with Damash in June 2012. In 2014 after six years and 105 appearances with Damash, Mokhtari signed with Gostaresh.

Club career statistics

References

External links 
Mohammad Mokhtari at PersianLeague.com

1984 births
Living people
Iranian footballers
Association football defenders
Shamoushak Noshahr players
Damash Gilan players
People from Tonekabon
Sportspeople from Mazandaran province
21st-century Iranian people